Richeza or Richenza is a woman's first name. It is a Polish name of Old Icelandic origin (Rikissa). In Old Icelandic Rixa means wealthy.  It can be compared to other names ending in -ric.

Richeza of Denmark (died 1220)
 Richeza of Sweden, Queen of Poland, mother of Elisabeth Richeza of Poland
Richeza of Poland, Queen of Castile (1140-1185)
Richeza of Poland, Queen of Hungary (1013-1075)
Richeza of Poland, Queen of Sweden (1116–after 1156)
 Elizabeth Richeza of Poland, Polish princess and Czech queen.
 Richeza of Berg (1095-1125), wife of Vladislav I of Bohemia and the Duchess of Bohemia. She was the daughter of count Henry I of Berg and his wife Adelheid of Mochental.
 Richeza of Lotharingia (died 1063), daughter of Count Palatine Ezzo of Lotharingia and niece of Emperor Otto III. and wife of Polish King Mieszko II Lambert.
 Richenza of Northeim, a member of the dynasty of the Counts of Northeim, and a German Empress.
Richeza Magnusdotter of Sweden (1285-1348)
Richeza of Sweden, Duchess of Poland (1270-1292)

Swedish feminine given names
Czech feminine given names
Polish feminine given names
German feminine given names